This article refers to the sport of tennis.

Kim Clijsters and Ai Sugiyama were the defending champions, but Clijsters chose not to participate, and only Sugiyama competed that year.
Sugiyama partnered with Shinobu Asagoe, but lost in the first round to Amélie Mauresmo and Mary Pierce.

Cara Black and Rennae Stubbs won in the final 4–6, 6–1, 6–4, against Virginia Ruano Pascual and Paola Suárez.

Seeds
All eight seeded pairs received a bye to the second round. Text in italics indicates the round those seeds were eliminated, while champion seeds are indicated in bold.

  Virginia Ruano Pascual /  Paola Suárez (final)
  Cara Black /  Rennae Stubbs (champions)
  Nadia Petrova /  Meghann Shaughnessy (second round)
  Martina Navratilova /  Lisa Raymond (semifinals)
  Elena Likhovtseva /  Vera Zvonareva (semifinals)
  Émilie Loit /  Nicole Pratt (second round)
  Tamarine Tanasugarn /  María Vento-Kabchi (second round)
  Eleni Daniilidou /  Liezel Huber (quarterfinals)

Draw

Finals

Top half

Bottom half

External links
 Main and Qualifying draws

Acura Classic - Doubles
Southern California Open
Azura Classic - Doubles